Sarah Abdullah Abdul Latif Mohammed (born 6 July 1990), shortly Sara Mohamed, is an Egyptian football defender. She is a member of the Egyptian national team. She played in the Turkish Women's First Football League for Trabzon İdmanocağı with jersey number 4.

Sara Mohamed was born in Cairo, Egypt on 6 July 1990.

Playing career

Club 

Mohamed played for the Cairo-based Wadi Degla SC before she moved in November 2017 to Turkey to join Trabzon İdmanocağı, who play in the Turkish Women's First Football League.

International
Mohamed appeared for the Egypt women's national football team  at the 2016 Africa Women Cup of Nations held in Cameroon.

References

1990 births
Living people
Footballers from Cairo
Women's association football defenders
Egyptian women's footballers
Egypt women's international footballers
Egyptian expatriate footballers
Egyptian expatriate sportspeople in Turkey
Expatriate women's footballers in Turkey
Trabzon İdmanocağı women's players

ar:سارة محمد